Isaac M. Jordan (born Isaac Alfred Jordan; May 5, 1835 – December 3, 1890) was a United States Congressman born in Mifflinburg, Union County, Pennsylvania. He served one term, elected as a Democrat to the 48th congress, (March 4, 1883 – March 3, 1885) in Ohio's 2nd congressional district, a strong Republican district. He was also one of the founding members of the Sigma Chi fraternity.

Career
Jordan was 20 years old when he became one of the founding members of the Sigma Chi Fraternity in 1855 at Miami University, Oxford, Ohio.  Jordan graduated from Miami University in 1857 and obtained his master's degree from Miami in 1862.  He was an orator of first and 15th Grand Chapters.

In a speech he gave in 1884, he stated the standard by which all pledges and brothers should be judged by, which is now known as the Jordan Standard. Following graduation from Miami, he studied law, was admitted to the bar, and practiced law in Dayton, Ohio and Cincinnati,  during which time he changed his middle initial to M (meaning nothing in particular) to distinguish himself from his brother and law partner Jackson A. Jordan, as he thought people would confuse J.A. and I.A. Jordan.  Isaac Jordan may have been born a Pennsylvania farm boy, but his ambitions were far grander than tending animals and harvesting crops. An important part of his life's journey was set early on when he moved to Ohio with his family and met Ben Runkle, who later described Jordan as a "playmate of my boyhood, a schoolmate, and a friend for the long and strenuous years of manhood... with boundless energy, lofty ambitions, gifted with untiring perseverance and the ability that made success a certainty." Jordan and Runkle, who was two years Jordan's junior, landed at Miami University together for college, and fittingly became fraternity brothers, first as Dekes, then as founders of the new fraternity, Sigma Phi, which later became known as Sigma Chi. Jordan displayed his goal-oriented nature throughout his collegiate career, and it was no surprise that he went straight to law school and practiced as an attorney until he was elected in 1882 to the U.S. Congress. In 1884, Brother Jordan gave a talk in which he outlined his view of the criteria by which a student should be considered for membership in Sigma Chi. That brief statement, which stresses the qualities of good character, became known as "The Jordan Standard." Who knows how far Jordan's ambitious purposes may have taken him had he not died unexpectedly in 1890. What is known is that this self-made man was admired deeply for his relentless energy, broad talents and unwavering dedication to all that he pursued.

Professionally he was admitted to bar in Columbus, Ohio in 1858 (attorney) 1858–1890.  He became a congressman of the first district of Ohio, 1883–85.

Death 

Jordan's accidental death from injuries received from falling down an elevator shaft in Cincinnati, Ohio, December 3, 1890 was deeply mourned throughout southwestern Ohio. The tragedy created a shock throughout the city. All courts adjourned and public businesses were stilled. The newspapers of the day devoted entire pages, with prominent headlines and drawings, to the occurrence.

Jordan is interred in Spring Grove Cemetery in Cincinnati.

References

External links 

 Official Sigma Chi Website
 

1835 births
1890 deaths
Ohio lawyers
People from Union County, Pennsylvania
Politicians from Cincinnati
Miami University alumni
Sigma Chi founders
Burials at Spring Grove Cemetery
Accidental deaths from falls
Accidental deaths in Ohio
19th-century American politicians
19th-century American lawyers
Democratic Party members of the United States House of Representatives from Ohio